Streptomyces milbemycinicus is a bacterium species from the genus of Streptomyces which has been isolated from soil. Streptomyces milbemycinicus produces milbemycin.

See also 
 List of Streptomyces species

References

Further reading

External links
Type strain of Streptomyces milbemycinicus at BacDive -  the Bacterial Diversity Metadatabase	

milbemycinicus
Bacteria described in 2010